Stang Mongkolsuk (15 July 1919 – 6 July 1971) was a Thai science educator. He was a professor in chemistry at the University of Medical Sciences, now Mahidol University, where he founded the Faculty of Science and was its first dean. He was instrumental in the faculty's development in its early years, and later also helped establish science education at Chiang Mai, Khon Kaen and Prince of Songkla universities, at the last of which he also served as president.

References

Stang Mongkolsuk
Stang Mongkolsuk
Stang Mongkolsuk
Stang Mongkolsuk
1919 births
1971 deaths